Keramia is a former municipality in the Chania regional unit, Crete, Greece. Since the 2011 local government reform it is part of the municipality Chania, of which it is a municipal unit. It is part of the former Kydonia Province.

Keramia covers the high villages in the foothills of the White Mountains (Lefka Ori) to the south of the city of Chania. Though apparently close to Chania, the access to the villages of Keramia is by narrow winding hill roads, and hence the area is little developed or visited by tourists.

The seat of the municipality was Gerolakos. The municipal unit also includes Malaxa, Katochori, Kontopoula and Drakona.

See also
List of communities of Chania

References

External links
Municipality description
GTP description

Populated places in Chania (regional unit)